HMS Dunkirk was a 60-gun fourth-rate ship of the line of the Royal Navy, built by Edward Allin at Woolwich Dockyard to the draught specified by the 1745 Establishment as amended in 1750, and launched on 22 July 1754.

Career
HMS Dunkirk was sent to America in 1755, along with several other ships, under Vice-Admiral Edward Boscawen. On 5 June she spotted four French ships which were bound for Canada under the command of Admiral Bois de la Mothe. Dunkirk,  and several other ships gave chase. After the captain of Alcide refused, Dunkirk opened fire. Soon afterwards,  came alongside the French at which Alcide struck her colours. Alcide had been carrying 900 troops and the governor of Louisbourg. The general of those troops was killed and 30,000 pounds sterling captured.

In 1778, Dunkirk was placed on harbour service under captain John Milligan, who had previously served as second lieutenant aboard . Milligan left the ship in 1782, and Dunkirk was sold out of the navy in that same year.

Notes

References

 Lavery, Brian (2003) The Ship of the Line - Volume 1: The development of the battlefleet 1650-1850. Conway Maritime Press. .

External links
 

Ships of the line of the Royal Navy
1754 ships